
Gmina Gorzyce is a rural gmina (administrative district) in Wodzisław County, Silesian Voivodeship, in southern Poland, on the Czech border. It is close to where the A1 motorway crosses the border into the Czech Republic to/from Poland

Neighbouring gminas
Gmina Gorzyce is bordered by the town of Wodzisław Śląski and by the gminas of Godów, Krzyżanowice and Lubomia. It also borders the Czech Republic.

Twin towns – sister cities

Gmina Gorzyce is twinned with:

 Bohumín, Czech Republic
 Dolní Lutyně, Czech Republic
 Kamianets-Podilskyi, Ukraine
 Stará Bystrica, Slovakia

See also
Kamień nad Odrą

References

External links
Official Gmina Gorzyce website 

Gorzyce
Gmina Gorzyce